Crystal Simone Dangerfield (born May 11, 1998) is an American basketball player for the Dallas Wings of the Women's National Basketball Association (WNBA). After a high school career that made her the nation's top-ranked point guard, she played college basketball for the UConn Huskies. Dangerfield was drafted in the second round of the 2020 WNBA draft by Minnesota, where she was named WNBA Rookie of the Year after leading the team in scoring.

High school
Dangerfield attended Blackman High School, where she belonged to the collegiate academy, and was an honor roll student for four years. She was Blackman's starting point guard for four years,  when the school won state titles in 2015 and 2016.

She played USA Basketball, winning a gold medal in 2013 and 2015. Dangerfield was named Miss Basketball Tennessee in her junior and senior years. She was three times the Tennessee Gatorade Player of the Year. She was a finalist for the Naismith Prep Player of the Year Award and Gatorade national awards. She was The Tennessean girls basketball player of the year in three consecutive years. In 2016, she was a McDonald's and Jordan Brand Classic All-American, and Morgan Wootten National Player of the Year.

Among the women's class of 2016, ESPNW ranked Dangerfield as the best point guard and third overall of 100 women players (behind Lauren Cox and ahead of Sabrina Ionescu).

College
Dangerfield was recruited by the UConn Huskies, and she studied business and majored in communication. When Dangerfield arrived, the Huskies had won a record 11 total and 4 straight NCAA championships, but during the period she played for them they were to lose three and have one canceled due to COVID-19.

Dangerfield had offseason hip surgeries in 2016 and 2019. In 2018, she said her quads had gotten too big and she was bothered by shin splints during 2017, her sophomore year. After surgery in 2019, she experienced back spasms and at one point her team had only eight healthy players. The Associated Press said in her senior year at UConn that she was "expected to be the team's leader."

In March 2020, Dangerfield rose to 5th place all-time among Huskies women's basketball players in career assists. She is second in the UConn records books behind Sue Bird with 225 single-season assists.

Following the 2019–20 season, Dangerfield was named an Honorable Mention All-American by the Associated Press. She was selected for the American Athletic Conference 2017 All-Freshman Team,  2018 All-Tournament Team, 2018 Third Team, 2019 All-Tournament Team, 2019 First Team, 2020 All-Tournament Team, and 2020 First Team; and the 2019 NCAA Regional All-Tournament Team.

WNBA

Minnesota Lynx (2020–2021)
Dangerfield was drafted with the 16th overall pick in the 2nd round of the 2020 WNBA draft by the Minnesota Lynx. Lynx coaches had explained to her that her rookie's role would be as a sub to provide relief for a few minutes per game. By midseason, due to multiple WNBA injuries and Odyssey Sims return from maternity leave, Dangerfield was the starting point guard, averaging 14.3 points per game, shooting 47.1% from the field, and was considered a candidate for WNBA Rookie of the Year, the lowest draft pick ever officially considered for the honor.

For August, she gained WNBA's formal recognition with a Rookie of the Month award for her record of 18.1 points per game, 3.5 assists per game and 2.0 rebounds per game. She repeated as Rookie of the Month in September with 17.4 points per game, 5.0 assists per game and 2.0 rebounds per game.

In her rookie season, Dangerfield was named to the 2020 AP All-Rookie team. She won the Associated Press Rookie of the Year, ESPN Rookie of the Year, and WNBA Rookie of the Year. She was the Lynx leading scorer for the year with 16.2 points per game.

On 3 May 2022, Dangerfield was waived by the Lynx.

Indiana Fever
On 6 May 2022, Dangerfield signed a hardship exception contract with the Indiana Fever.

New York Liberty
On May 21, 2022, Dangerfield signed a hardship exception contract with the Liberty.

On June 7, 2022, the Liberty ended Dangerfield's contract, but signed a second hardship exception contract two days later., but then she was released on June 26.

On July 3, 2022, the Liberty signed Dangerfield to a rest of season contract. On January 16, 2023, Dangerfield was traded to the Dallas Wings as part of a three-team deal.

WNBA career statistics

Regular season

|-
| style='text-align:left;'|2020
| style='text-align:left;'|Minnesota
| 21 || 19 || 30.0 || .471 || .333 || .922 || 2.0 || 3.6 || 0.9 || 0.0 || 2.6 || 16.2
|-
| style='text-align:left;'|2021
| style='text-align:left;'|Minnesota
| 31 || 10 || 20.1 || .388 || .359 || .857 || 2.0 || 2.8 || 0.7 || 0.1 || 1.4 || 7.7
|-
| style='text-align:left;'|2022
| style='text-align:left;'|Indiana
| 3 || 0 || 16.3 || .429 || .333 || 1.000 || 1.0 || 3.3 || 0.0 || 0.7 || 1.0 || 6.0
|-
| style='text-align:left;'|2022
| style='text-align:left;'|New York
| 30 || 27 || 22.1 || .395 || .323 || .700 || 2.1 || 2.5 || 0.6 || 0.1 || 0.9 || 5.4
|-
| style='text-align:left;'| Career
| style='text-align:left;'| 3 years, 3 teams
| 85 || 56 || 23.1 || .424 || .339 || .857 || 2.0 || 2.9 || 0.7 || 0.1 || 1.5 || 8.9

Playoffs

|-
| style='text-align:left;'|2020
| style='text-align:left;'|Minnesota
| 4 || 4 || 34.0 || .340 || .250 || .636 || 2.8 || 3.8 || 1.0 || 0.0 || 2.0 || 11.8
|-
| style='text-align:left;'|2021
| style='text-align:left;'|Minnesota
| 1 || 0 || 24.0 || .200 || .000 || .000 || 1.0 || 2.0 || 1.0 || 0.0 || 2.0 || 2.0
|-
| style='text-align:left;'|2022
| style='text-align:left;'|New York
| 3 || 2 || 9.0 || .273 || .250 || .000 || 0.3 || 0.3 || 0.0 || 0.0 || 0.7 || 2.3
|-
| style='text-align:left;'| Career
| style='text-align:left;'| 3 years, 2 teams
| 8 || 6 || 23.4 || .319 || .227 || .636 || 1.6 || 2.3 || 0.6 || 0.0 || 1.5 || 7.0

College statistics

College

Personal life
Dangerfield is the youngest daughter of Christopher and Davonna Dangerfield of Murfreesboro, Tennessee. She has an older brother, Komar, and one sister, Brooke. Both parents served in the U.S. Army. She has played basketball since she was 5. Her favorite players are Kobe Bryant and Maya Moore.

Dangerfield has participated in numerous charities such as Let's Move!, Foundation for Life “Bikes for Kids,” Athletes for Hope, and food banks. In college, she helped Bags of Love provide toiletries to homeless people in Hartford, Connecticut.

References

External links 
 WNBA profile
 Career statistics from NCAA.org and Basketball-Reference.com

1998 births
Living people
American women's basketball players
Basketball players from Tennessee
Indiana Fever players
LGBT basketball players
LGBT people from Tennessee
Lesbian sportswomen
McDonald's High School All-Americans
Minnesota Lynx draft picks
Minnesota Lynx players
New York Liberty players
People from Murfreesboro, Tennessee
Point guards
UConn Huskies women's basketball players